Creeping Bent,  The Creeping Bent Organisation, is an independent record label set up by Douglas MacIntyre in 1994, based in Glasgow, Scotland. The label has been described as a successor to earlier Scottish indie labels Postcard Records and Fast Product.
Creeping Bent was officially launched with an event at Glasgow’s Tramway theatre on 12 December 1994 called "A Leap Into The Void" in homage to Yves Klein, and featuring film, theatre and pop music. "Frankie Teardrop", a 1995 collaboration between Suicide vocalist Alan Vega and Altered Images drummer Stephen Lironi, was an NME single of the week in 1995. Creeping Bent was chosen by John Peel as the featured label when he curated the 1998 Meltdown Festival at the Royal Festival Hall. Creeping Bent artists record 20 sessions for Peel’s BBC Radio 1 show. The label celebrated its 20th anniversary in January 2014 with shows featuring Sexual Objects, and the Pop Group playing at Celtic Connections.

Recent years have seen further releases by Port Sulphur, Jazzateers, Transelement, Gareth Sager.

Artists
 Adventures in Stereo 
 Appendix Out a.k.a. Alasdair Roberts
 The Fire Engines 
 Future Pilot A.K.A., a.k.a. Sushil K. Dade, who has released collaborations with Runaways producer Kim Fowley and writer Alasdair Gray among others
 Vic Godard, formerly of the punk group Subway Sect
 The Nectarine No. 9, featuring former Fire Engines frontman Davy Henderson
 Monica Queen
 Gareth Sager, formerly of The Pop Group 
 The Secret Goldfish
 Alan Vega, formerly of the electronic duo Suicide
 Bill Wells & Isobel Campbell's 2002 album Ghost of Yesterday

See also
 List of record labels
 List of independent UK record labels

References

External links
 Creeping Bent website

British independent record labels
Record labels established in 1994
Organisations based in Glasgow
1994 establishments in Scotland
IFPI members